Ebaeides perakensis is a species of beetle in the family Cerambycidae. It was described by Breuning in 1959.

References

Ebaeides
Beetles described in 1959